Kaiyun Town is a town and the seat of Hengshan County in the province of Hunan, China. It has 17 villages and 8 communities under its jurisdiction, its seat is Shiguqiao Village.

History
The name of Kaiyun means that the watery clouds went out of sight or disappeared. It is said that Han Yu, a great writer in the Tang dynasty came to Hengshan County. He wanted to climb the Mount Hengshan, but it had been raining and covering the mountains with clouds and fog. He recited poems and prayed, and it turned out to be cloudless and sunny. After that, a building named Kaiyun Tower was set up in the place of his poetry in memory of the great writer.

Subdivision

References

External links
 Official Website / Chinese (中文)

Hengshan County
County seats in Hunan